Sankt Andrä-Wördern is a municipality in the district of Tulln in the Austrian state of Lower Austria.

Population

Notable people
 Kurt Waldheim (1918–2007), Austrian president and the fourth Secretary-General of the United Nations (1972–1981)

References

External links 

 www.staw.at - town website

Cities and towns in Tulln District